The year 647 BC was a year of the pre-Julian Roman calendar. In the Roman Empire, it was known as year 107 Ab urbe condita . The denomination 647 BC for this year has been used since the early medieval period, when the Anno Domini calendar era became the prevalent method in Europe for naming years.

Events

Middle East 
 Elam refuses to extradite an Aramaean prince, giving the king Ashurbanipal of Assyria an excuse to invade the country. He sacks the city of Susa.
 Ashurbanipal and his Queen in the Garden, from the palace at Nineveh (modern Kuyunjik, Iraq), is made. It is now at the British Museum, London.

Births

Deaths

References